Gerhard Hamilton Brand (8 October 1906 – 4 February 1996) was a Springbok rugby union footballer who played in 16 tests between 1928 and 1938. Brand has been described as the best kicker of his era, as well as a "magnificent defensive player" with a "wonderful tackle". According to Guinness World Records he executed the longest drop goal in rugby union to date. Brand's 55 test career points for the Springboks set a 27-year record (1938–65), which was eventually surpassed by Keith Oxlee.

Early life
Gerhard Hamilton Brand received his second name for the Hamilton Rugby Football Club in Sea Point, Cape Town, which had won the Western Province Rugby Football Union's 1906 Grand Challenge Cup club competition two days before his birth. He grew up in Sea Point and learnt rugby from the age of 8.

He attended Sea Point Boys High School, and as a young man played scrum-half for Hamiltons, whose name he carried. He was an introvert, according to his friend, Danie Craven. In 1936 Brand helped Hamiltons win the provincial championship, a feat the club did not repeat for the next 73 years. The club instituted the Gerry Brand trophy for best full-back which was awarded to a Hamiltonian annually.

During the rugby off-season Brand and his fellow Hamilton players supported and played for the local baseball team, the Sea Point Cardinals. A 1934 Australian newspaper described Brand as an accomplished baseball player, and he did attain provincial colours in that sport. The newspaper speculated that Brand could be chosen for a proposed exchange of baseball tours between South Africa and Japan.

Rugby career

Provincial career 
Brand was first selected to play for Western Province in 1927, the year that his team won the Currie Cup championships. He would turn out for Province until he was 38 years old. Along the way Brand scored 24 points in a match against South Western Districts, a record for a provincial game that stood until 1950, when it was surpassed by Basie Viviers. In 1934 Brand established a Currie Cup series record of 70 points in 6 matches – 67 points from kicks and 3 points from a solitary try.

In 1945 Brand played his last match for the Western Province before retiring from rugby.

International career 
In 1928 Brand made his debut for the Springboks on the wing against New Zealand, and played in two tests that year.

Brand was also selected for Bennie Osler's Springbok touring party to the United Kingdom and Ireland in 1931–32. He played in 18 of the 26 tour matches, scoring 72 points in total. In the test against England on 2 January 1932 Brand caught the ball close to the halfway line and against the touch line. Steadying himself, he calmly dropped a goal which travelled  from point of impact to where it landed in the stands. The kick was the highlight of an otherwise dour match and helped Brand's team to a 7–0 victory. His drop goal was later described as "probably the best drop goal ever seen at Twickenham".

Brand was appointed captain of the Western Province team in 1932. During 1933 he played in all five tests against the visiting Wallabies of 1933.

He was part of the 1937 Springbok tour to Australasia, during which he scored 90 points in seven matches – a record that stood for 56 years. His 209 points in all for the tour became another long-standing record. Brand kicked 69 conversions, which continues to be the record for most conversions on a Springbok tour. The team lost only two matches and was regarded as the unofficial world rugby champions. Brand and his 1937 teammates remain the only Springbok team so far "to win a full test series on New Zealand soil".

On their 1938 tour to South Africa the British and Irish Lions encountered Brand in three defeats. He captained the Western Province Town and Country XV which handed the Lions their first defeat on tour. Brand's wide-angled kick during the dying minutes of the game propelled his team to an 11–8 victory. At Cape Town's Newlands Stadium Brand led the Western Province to a 21–11 triumph to which he contributed nine points.

His name was among the first listed for the Springboks for the first test at Ellis Park Stadium in Johannesburg. A record crowd of 36,000 watched Brand kick 14 points (4 conversions and 2 penalties) in the Springboks' 26–12 defeat of the Lions. The kicking contest between Brand and the Lions full-back, Vivian Jenkins, produced "two of the most remarkable goals ever kicked in rugby football". Jenkins succeeded with a 63-yard penalty kick, taken 8 yards inside his team's half of the field. Not to be outdone, Brand drop-kicked a 60-yard penalty from almost exactly the same place as his famous Twickenham kick.

The test against the Lions proved to be Brand's last international game, as he picked up a recurring thigh injury during preparations for the second test. In all he turned out in 46 matches for the Springboks, scoring 293 points – a record only surpassed in the 1990s by the Springbok fly-half Naas Botha. Brand's tally still placed him 6th on the 2013 list of most points scored in all Springbok matches.

Danie Craven said of Brand: "I regard him, along with Bennie Osler, as a legend among legends – an unforgettable Springbok".

Personal life 
Brand was appointed a national selector in the 1960s and owned a filling station in Bloemfontein. Later he lived in Fish Hoek outside Cape Town, and suffered a light stroke in 1987.

International statistics
Brand played in 16 tests for the Springboks during which he scored 55 points. He was renowned for never missing an important kick.

Summary

Test match record

Legend: try (3 pts); pen = penalty (3 pts.); conv = conversion (2 pts.), drop = drop kick (4 pts.).

References

1906 births
1996 deaths
Rugby union players from Cape Town
South Africa international rugby union players
South African rugby union players
Rugby union fullbacks
South African baseball players
Alumni of Sea Point High School
Hamilton RFC, Sea Point players